David Stride (14 March 1958 – 10 July 2016) was an English professional footballer who played in both England and the United States.

Career
Stride began his career with Chelsea in 1978. That year, he went on loan with the Memphis Rogues of the North American Soccer League. In 1980, Chelsea sold Stride's contract to the Rogues. In 1981, Memphis sent him to the Minnesota Kicks. In the fall of 1981, he signed with the Cleveland Force of the Major Indoor Soccer League. In 1982, he moved to the Jacksonville Tea Men. Following the 1982 NASL season, Stride returned to England to play for Millwall and Leyton Orient. In 1985, he returned to the United States to play for the Dallas Sidekicks of Major Indoor Soccer League.

Managerial career
In the 2000s, Stride co-managed Lymington Town alongside John Pyatt when the club competed in the Hampshire League. In 2015, Stride was sacked by Bashley after just 40 days in the job for "a run of poor pre-season results and lack of player signings" after overseeing just two friendly losses in his time at the club. Stride described the debacle as "absolute codswallop".

Death
Stride died of a heart attack on 10 July 2016.

References

External links
Player profile at Dallas Sidekicks
NASL/MISL stats

1958 births
2016 deaths
People from Lymington
English footballers
English football managers
English expatriate footballers
Chelsea F.C. players
Memphis Rogues players
Calgary Boomers players
Minnesota Kicks players
Cleveland Force (original MISL) players
Jacksonville Tea Men players
Millwall F.C. players
Leyton Orient F.C. players
Dallas Sidekicks (original MISL) players
Wellworthy Athletic F.C. players
A.F.C. Lymington players
Major Indoor Soccer League (1978–1992) players
North American Soccer League (1968–1984) indoor players
North American Soccer League (1968–1984) players
Expatriate soccer players in the United States
English Football League players
Lymington Town F.C. managers
Bashley F.C. managers
Association football defenders
English expatriate sportspeople in the United States
English expatriate sportspeople in Canada
Expatriate soccer players in Canada